Phillip Cory Bailey (born January 24, 1971) is a former professional baseball pitcher who played in Major League Baseball between  and . He batted and threw right-handed.

Biography
A Crab Orchard High School and Marion High School graduate, Bailey was an outstanding pitcher for Southeastern Illinois College from - and was named to the All-Region team. Selected by the Boston Red Sox in the  draft, he pitched for four Major League clubs in part of eight seasons, filling relief roles coming out from the bullpen as a middle reliever and as a set-up man as well. In a spring training game on April 2, 1993, Frank Viola and Bailey combined on a no-hitter as the Red Sox defeated the Phillies 10–0 at Jack Russell Memorial Stadium in Clearwater, Florida.

Bailey reached the majors in 1993 with the Boston Red Sox, spending two years with them before moving to the St. Louis Cardinals (-), San Francisco Giants (-) and Kansas City Royals (-). His most productive season came in 1996 with St. Louis, when he posted career-highs with five wins and a 3.00 ERA. He had another decent season in 2001 for Kansas City, striking out 61 batters in  innings, also career-numbers. In 172 games, Bailey compiled a 9–10 record with one save a 3.96 ERA.

On April 10, 2002, Bailey notched his one and only MLB save against the Red Sox. He pitched 1 1/3 innings, striking out 3 and preserving the 6-2 Royals victory. On May 26, 2002, Bailey won both ends of a doubleheader against the Texas Rangers, becoming the first pitcher since David Wells in 1989 to accomplish the feat.

After that, he played with the Yomiuri Giants in Japan's Central League (-), La New Bears of Taiwan's Chinese Professional Baseball League, Long Island Ducks of the independent Atlantic League, Iowa Cubs which is a Triple-A team of the Chicago Cubs

Personal
The city of Marion, where Bailey was born, named a street after him, and the Crab Orchard High School is located on Cory Bailey Street.

Bailey is currently working at Future Swings in Marion, IL.

References

External links

Retrosheet
SABR files
Southeastern Illinois College

1971 births
Living people
American expatriate baseball players in Japan
American expatriate baseball players in Taiwan
Baseball players from Illinois
Boston Red Sox players
Elmira Pioneers players
Fresno Grizzlies players
Gulf Coast Red Sox players
Iowa Cubs players
Kansas City Royals players
La New Bears players
Long Island Ducks players
Louisville Redbirds players
Lynchburg Red Sox players
Major League Baseball pitchers
Nashville Sounds players
Oklahoma City 89ers players
Omaha Golden Spikes players
Pawtucket Red Sox players
People from Marion, Illinois
Phoenix Firebirds players
San Francisco Giants players
St. Louis Cardinals players
Yomiuri Giants players
Dmedia T-REX players
American expatriate baseball players in Venezuela
Tigres de Aragua players